The 2010–11 Tour de Ski was the 5th edition of the Tour de Ski and took place from 31 December 2010 to 9 January 2011. The race started in Oberhof, Germany, and ended in Val di Fiemme, Italy. The defending champions were Lukáš Bauer of the Czech Republic for the men and Poland's Justyna Kowalczyk for the women. Kowalczyk defende her title, and Swiss Dario Cologna won the Men's title.

Final standings

Overall standings

Sprint standings

Stages

Stage 1
31 December 2010, Oberhof, Germany - prologue

Stage 2
1 January 2011, Oberhof - distance (handicap start)

Stage 3
2 January 2011, Oberstdorf, Germany - sprint

Stage 4
3 January 2011, Oberstdorf - pursuit

Stage 5
5 January 2011, Toblach, Italy - sprint F

Stage 6
6 January 2011, Cortina d'Ampezzo – Toblach - distance (handicap start)

Stage 7
8 January 2011, Val di Fiemme, Italy - distance (mass start)

Stage 8
9 January 2011, Val di Fiemme - distance (handicap start)

References

2010–11 FIS Cross-Country World Cup
2010 11
December 2010 sports events in Europe
January 2011 sports events in Europe
Tour de Ski 2010-11